Vstrechny may refer to:
Vstrechny, Chukotka Autonomous Okrug, an urban-type settlement in Chukotka Autonomous Okrug, Russia
Vstrechny, Samara Oblast, a rural locality (a settlement) in Samara Oblast, Russia
Vstrechny, Stavropol Krai, a rural locality (a settlement) in Stavropol Krai, Russia